The I.J. Fox Building is a historic commercial building located at 407 Washington Street in Downtown Boston, Massachusetts.

Description and history 
It is a seven-story masonry structure, three bays wide, with Moderne and Art Deco styling. It was built in 1934 as the premiere city showroom and facilities of I.J. Fox, then one of the nation's leading furriers. It is one of the city's finest examples of the Moderne style, with its most prominent feature a polished granite two-story entrance.

The building was listed on the National Register of Historic Places on December 29, 2015.

See also
National Register of Historic Places listings in northern Boston, Massachusetts

References

Commercial buildings completed in 1934
Commercial buildings on the National Register of Historic Places in Massachusetts
Commercial buildings in Boston
National Register of Historic Places in Boston
1934 establishments in Massachusetts